Penthouse and Pavement is the debut studio album by English new wave and synth-pop band Heaven 17, released in September 1981 by Virgin Records.

"(We Don't Need This) Fascist Groove Thang" was released as a single, but did not achieve chart success, partly due to a ban by the BBC. The album sold reasonably well, but was not a great commercial success on release. It has since been regarded as "an important outing", is included in the book 1001 Albums You Must Hear Before You Die, and was re-released in 2010 in a three-disc special edition.

Reception

Whilst the singles charted poorly, the album charted at No. 14 and remained in the Top 100 for 77 weeks. It was certified gold (100,000 copies sold) by the BPI in October 1982.

Reviewing the album for NME, Paul Morley said: "Penthouse and Pavement is fabulous and it won't deny your needs and you just put our faith in it because it is true." It was ranked the fifth best album of 1981 by NME.

In a retrospective review, Dan LeRoy of AllMusic felt that the album combined electropop with good melodies, and that Glenn Gregory was able to deliver the "overtly left-wing political" lyrics without sounding "pretentious".

The album is included in the musical reference book 1001 Albums You Must Hear Before You Die.

Track listing

Additional tracks

2010 3-disc special edition
The album was reproduced live in its entirety in a series of concerts the band held throughout 2010, one of which (in Sheffield) was filmed and shown on BBC Two on 16 May 2010. The following night a documentary about the making of the album was screened; this was later included on a new three-disc special edition of the album released in November 2010.

Disc 1

"(We Don't Need This) Fascist Groove Thang"
"Penthouse and Pavement"
"Play to Win"
"Soul Warfare"
"Geisha Boys and Temple Girls"
"Let's All Make a Bomb"
"The Height of the Fighting"
"Song with No Name"
"We're Going to Live for a Very Long Time"
"I'm Your Money" (12" Version)
"Are Everything" (12" Version)
"Decline of the West"*

Disc 2

"Penthouse and Pavement" (Original Demo)
"(We Don't Need This) Fascist Groove Thang" (Original Demo)
"Play to Win" (Original Demo Instrumental)
"Soul Warfare" (Original Demo)
"Are Everything" (Original Demo)
"BEF Ident" (Alternate Version)*
"Decline of the West" (Alternate Version)*
"Rise of the East" (Alternate Version)*
"Music to Kill Your Parents By" (Alternate Version)*
"Uptown Apocalypse" (Alternate Version)*
"A Baby Called Billy" (Alternate Version)*
"Rhythmic Experiment 1"*
"Rhythmic Experiment 2"*
"Boys of Buddha Experiment"*
"At the Height of the Fighting" (Original Rhythm Track)
"Rhythmic Loop Experiment"*
"Funky Experiment"*
"Song Experiment"*
"Heavy Drum Experiment"*
"Play to Win" (Original Demo With Vocals)

* credited to B.E.F.

Disc 3 (DVD)
The Story of Penthouse And Pavement (2010 documentary)

Personnel 
Heaven 17
 Glenn Gregory – lead vocals, backing vocals
 Martyn Ware – pianos, synthesizers, Linn LM-1, percussion, backing vocals
 Ian Craig Marsh – synthesizers, saxophone, percussion

Session musicians
 Malcolm Veale – synthesizers, saxophone
 The Boys of Buddha – synthetic horns
 Steve Travell – acoustic piano (4)
 John Wilson – guitars (1-4), guitar synthesizers (1-4), bass (1-4)
 Josie James – backing vocals (2)

Production 
 Bob Last – executive producer 
 British Electric Foundation – producers, packaging design 
 Peter Walsh – production assistant (2, 3, 4, 6), engineer (2, 3, 4, 6)
 Steve Rance – engineer (5, 7, 8, 9)
 Ray Smith – cover painting

Charts

Certifications

In popular culture
"Penthouse and Pavement" is featured in the hit 1982 film Night Shift (starring Henry Winkler and Michael Keaton and was included on the film's soundtrack. The song is also included in Rockstar Games video game Grand Theft Auto: Vice City Stories where it is played on the fictional radio station Wave 103.

Notes
¹ – The last track on the original vinyl LP release, "We're Going to Live for a Very Long Time", was recorded up to and onto the runoff groove; meaning the runtime of this track (as labelled on the LP sleeve) and the album is infinite, looping the line "For a very long time".
"Groove Thang", "Decline of the West" and "B.E.F. Ident" originally appeared on the B.E.F. cassette-only release Music for Stowaways (1981).
All tracks were mixed at Red Bus Studios except "(We Don't Need This) Fascist Groove Thang" and "Let's All Make a Bomb" which were mixed at The Townhouse.
The Canadian LP and cassette releases included the original version of "I'm Your Money" and an uncredited "B.E.F. Ident" between "Geisha Boys and Temple Girls" and "Let's All Make a Bomb." The cassette's version of "Play to Win" is an edited version of the 12" single mix. This version was later released on the 1986 UK compilation Endless (cassette version only)

References

External links

Penthouse and Pavement (Adobe Flash) at Radio3Net (streamed copy where licensed)

1981 debut albums
Heaven 17 albums
Virgin Records albums
Electropop albums